The Justice Prisoner and Alien Transportation System (JPATS), nicknamed "Con Air", is a United States Marshals Service airline charged with the transportation of persons in legal custody among prisons, detention centers, courthouses, and other locations. It is the largest prison transport network in the world.  Though primarily used by the Federal Bureau of Prisons or U.S. Immigration and Customs Enforcement, JPATS also assists military and state law enforcement.

The agency is managed by the USMS out of the JPATS headquarters in Kansas City, Missouri. JPATS was formed in 1995 from the merger of the Marshals Service air fleet with that of the Immigration and Naturalization Service. JPATS completes more than 260,000 prisoner/alien movements per year. Air fleet operations are located in Oklahoma City, Oklahoma, with hubs in Las Vegas, Nevada; Puerto Rico and the Virgin Islands. Additionally, the Federal Transfer Center at Oklahoma City's Will Rogers World Airport was built especially to facilitate prisoner transport on JPATS.

Usually, the airline employs Boeing 737-400 aircraft to transport convicts and illegal residents of the United States for extradition.  Smaller jets and turboprops are also used to transport individual prisoners who are considered particularly dangerous or notorious, as well as individuals in the witness protection program.

According to the Boeing Jetliner Databook, JPATS operates three Boeing 737s. JPATS also operates an additional Saab 2000 turboprop.

JPATS aircraft use the ICAO designator DOJ with the callsign JUSTICE.

History and evolution
On November 1, 1919, San Francisco Police officer (and future barnstormer) Ivan R. Gates became the first to transport a prisoner by air, one James Kelly (convicted for carry concealed weapons), from Alameda to the waiting arms of San Francisco Police Chief D. A. White.

Prior to the existence of JPATS, the air transport of federal inmates over long distances was complicated. The process required an escort by two U.S. Marshals, accompanying the inmate on a regular passenger airplane. This posed numerous problems, including danger to civilians, a backlog of marshals needed to perform such escorts, and a high taxpayer expense.

On August 20, 1985, the U.S. Marshals were offered a transfer from the Federal Aviation Administration (FAA) of a Boeing 727 aircraft. Though no purpose was originally designated for this plane, one official had the idea of using it for the mass transportation of federal inmates. JPATS' predecessor was the National Prisoner Transportation System of the U.S. Marshals Service.

The airline ultimately improved the efficiency of inmate transportation and made the sight of a shackled commercial airline passenger largely a thing of the past. For a plane full of 200 inmates, only 12 marshals are required. Marshals are trained with aircraft emergency procedures very similar to those flight attendants learn to protect the aircraft's occupants.

Today

Today's JPATS fleet has expanded to three full-sized aircraft. These planes fly a large series of routes that serve nearly every major U.S. city.

The flight schedules are kept secret from the public, and are known only to those directly involved in its operation. Inmates scheduled to fly are given little or no advance notice of their flight, to deter escapes and sabotage, and to prevent harm from outsiders.

Passengers aboard a flight are restrained with handcuffs as well as ankle and waist chains which are double- or even triple-locked. Those who pose additional danger may be forced to wear additional restraints, such as reinforced mittens that completely isolate and almost completely immobilize the hands, handcuff covers which conceal the keyholes, and face masks to prevent biting and spitting. However, due to FAA regulations inmates are not physically restrained to their seats in any way except for seat belts used during takeoff and landing.

Flight and seating arrangements are made carefully with the intent to separate inmates who may  conflict with one another. Members of rival prison gangs may be transported on different days to help reduce the risk of an in-flight incident.

Unlike the practice of most jails, male and female inmates fly together on the same planes.

Fleet
, the JPATS fleet consists of the following aircraft:

Fleet development 
, JPATS were considering purchasing an additional Boeing 737 to aid its detainee and prisoner transport efforts.

In popular culture
Con Air (1997) starring Nicolas Cage draws heavy inspiration and basis from the operations on the agency, with the title being a reference to the agency's nickname. The movie portrayed the interior of the plane (a C-123 Provider, which JPATS does not operate) as a much steelier, more prison-like environment than a typical JPATS aircraft, which in reality looks much like any other airliner. The film's screenplay explains this by saying that the prisoners on the flight are "the worst of the worst", including several serial killers and mass murderers.
U.S. Marshals (1998) depicted the story of a JPATS Flight 343, a Boeing 727-200 that crashed during flight and the manhunt for a prisoner who escapes following the crash.
The Freakazoid! episode "Island of Dr. Mystico" features an airline named "Prison Air", a parody of JPATS.
In The Unusuals episode "The Dentist" (2009), Det. Eddie Alvarez asks suspended U.S. Marshal and suspected felon Ben Foster if he will be transporting a prisoner via "JPATS". Marshal Foster appears confused until Det. Alvarez explains that it is the "Justice Prisoner and Alien Transportation System". Marshal Foster then confirms the prisoner will be transported via JPATS, however he is really breaking the prisoner out of custody after robbing the police precinct of valuable evidence against a dentist.
In the Orange Is the New Black episode "Thirsty Bird" (2014), prisoner Piper Chapman is transported on a JPATS plane for a transfer from Litchfield prison in New York to a Chicago detention facility. US Marshals are shown doing prisoner pat-downs before boarding and then staffing the flight. Prisoners are shown boarding the flight from various locations, including both male and female.

Notes

References

External links 
 

Airlines of the United States
Police aviation units of the United States
United States Department of Justice agencies
Government agencies established in 1995
Airlines based in Missouri